Norbert Jaskot (born 19 July 1971) is a Polish fencer. He competed in the sabre events at the 1992, 1996 and 2000 Summer Olympics.

References

External links
 

1971 births
Living people
Polish male fencers
Olympic fencers of Poland
Fencers at the 1992 Summer Olympics
Fencers at the 1996 Summer Olympics
Fencers at the 2000 Summer Olympics
Sportspeople from Poznań
21st-century Polish people
20th-century Polish people